Frank Pratt may refer to:
 
Frank Pratt (baseball) (1897–1974), baseball player
Frank Pratt (politician) (1942–2021), Arizona politician
Frank Pratt (racing driver) in 1948 Australian Grand Prix

See also
Francis Pratt (disambiguation)
Franklin Seaver Pratt (1829–1894), Hawaiian politician and businessman